This is a list of Princesses Royal of Portugal (or more formally Princess Royal of the Kingdom of Portugal and the Algarves). The title is, since 1815, carried either in her own right by the heiress to the throne, as a substantive title, or by the wife of the heir to the throne, the Prince Royal of Portugal, as a courtesy title. It was preceded by the titles Princess of Brazil and Princess of Portugal.

The title was created in 1815 when John VI (at the time Prince-Regent) elevated colonial Brazil to the status of kingdom inside the United Kingdom of Portugal, Brazil and the Algarves (thus forcing the extinction of the until then used title Prince of Brazil). The heir became the Princess Royal of the United Kingdom of Portugal, Brazil and the Algarves. When Brazil declared its independence, the title was changed to the current state.

The holders of the title were styled Royal Highness (HRH) and were also Duchesses of Braganza, Duchesses of Guimarães, Duchesses of Barcelos, Marchioness of Vila Viçosa, Countess of Arraiolos, Countess of Ourém, Countess of Barcelos, Countess of Faria, Countess of Neiva and Countess of Guimarães.

Princess Royal of Portugal

By birth
This is a list of Princess Royal of Portugal who held the title by their own rights:
Note: Lighter shade of blue means that the person was not titled Princess Royal, being only the first in the line of succession. After 1834, Princes Royal needed to be officially sworn as such in Parliament to legally bear the title.

By marriage

This is a list of Princess Royal of Portugal who held the title by their marriage to the Prince Royal of Portugal:
Note: Lighter shade of blue means that the person was not titled Princess Royal, being only wife of the person first in the line of succession.

Notes

See also
List of Portuguese consorts
Princess of Portugal
Princess of Brazil
Princess of Beira

 
Portugal
Portugal